Junior García (born October 1, 1995) is a Dominican professional baseball pitcher who is a free agent. He was signed by the Houston Astros as an international free agent in 2012.

Career

Houston Astros
On October 17, 2012, García signed with the Houston Astros as an international free agent. He made his professional debut in 2013 with the Dominican Summer League Astros, recording a 2.67 ERA in 14 games. In 2014, García split the season between the rookie-level GCL Astros and the Low-A Tri-City ValleyCats, posting a cumulative 2.89 ERA in 13 appearances between the two teams. He began the 2015 season with the rookie-level Greeneville Astros, and also played in 2 games for Tri-City.

Arizona Diamondbacks
On August 8, 2015, García was traded to the Arizona Diamondbacks in exchange for Oliver Perez. He finished the season with the rookie-level Missoula Osprey, logging a 2-2 record and 3.74 ERA in 5 starts.

In 2016, García split the season between the Low-A Hillsboro Hops and the Single-A Kane County Cougars, registering a 7-8 record and 4.53 ERA with 92 strikeouts in 119.1 innings of work between the two teams. The following year, García again split the year between Kane County and Hillsboro, pitching to a 4-3 record and 1.74 ERA in 24 appearances. For the 2018 season, García played in High-A with the Visalia Rawhide, posting a 2-3 record and 1.82 ERA in 24 appearances. He split the 2019 season between the Double-A Jackson Generals and Visalia, recording a 3-1 record and 2.53 ERA with 16 strikeouts in 32.0 innings of work.

García did not play in a game in 2020 due to the cancellation of the minor league season because of the COVID-19 pandemic. He was assigned to the Double-A Amarillo Sod Poodles to begin the 2021 season before receiving a promotion to the Triple-A Reno Aces in May. He finished the year with a cumulative 3.47 ERA with 38 strikeouts and 5 saves in 36.1 innings pitched.

García was assigned to Double-A Amarillo to begin the 2022 season. In 24 appearances for the team, he struggled to a 1-1 record and 7.86 ERA with 28 strikeouts and 4 saves in 26.1 innings pitched. He was released by the Diamondbacks organization on July 18, 2022.

International career
García was named to the Dominican Republic national baseball team for the 2020 Summer Olympics (contested in 2021).

References

External links

1995 births
Living people
Dominican Republic expatriate baseball players in the United States
Dominican Summer League Diamondbacks players
Gulf Coast Astros players
Tri-City ValleyCats players
Greeneville Astros players 
Missoula Osprey players
Kane County Cougars players
Hillsboro Hops players
Visalia Rawhide players 
Gigantes del Cibao players
Amarillo Sod Poodles players
Reno Aces players
Baseball players at the 2020 Summer Olympics
Medalists at the 2020 Summer Olympics
Olympic medalists in baseball
Olympic bronze medalists for the Dominican Republic
Olympic baseball players of the Dominican Republic